West Springfield High School is a public high school located in unincorporated Fairfax County, Virginia, at 6100 Rolling Road, and is part of the Fairfax County Public Schools system. West Springfield (often referred to as WSHS) enrolls students from grades 9–12, offers the Advanced Placement program and currently enrolls over 2,400 students.

The facility has a Springfield postal address and is physically within the West Springfield census-designated place.

History
The school opened in 1966. A school renovation was completed in 1991, which included the construction of new classrooms in a courtyard and remodeling the library, Auditorium, Spartan Hall, and the Career Center.
The first principal was S. John Davis, who subsequently became Fairfax Superintendent of Schools and served as Virginia state Superintendent.
Planning for a $75 million, 4-year renovation was started in 2012, and actual renovations began in Summer 2016. The renovations concluded in September 2019 which included a new dance studio.

Demographics 
For the 2019-20 school year, West Springfield High School's student body was 48.15% White, 17.59% Hispanic, 15.07% Asian, 11.59% Black and 7.60% Other. It was also 48.45% female and 51.55% male.

Athletics

WSHS participates in a wide variety of high school sports. West Springfield's school mascot is a Spartan soldier and school colors are orange and blue.

The school competes in the Patriot District which is in the AAA Northern Region of the Virginia High School League.

Varsity softball
The Varsity Softball Team won the AAA State Softball title in 1983.

Debate and forensics
Students from both Forensics and Debate compete in the Washington Arlington Catholic Forensics League (WACFL) tournaments in the Diocese of Arlington. Students also compete in invitational tournaments at universities along the East Coast, including Yale University, St. Joseph's University, and George Mason University. 

The Forensics Team won its first Group AAA crown in 2006, and won again in 2009. Debate also won the Group AAA in 2009.

Varsity baseball
The Spartan baseball team won the Virginia AAA State Championships in 1991, 1998, and 2010, and the Class 6 title in 2018.

The Spartan Baseball motto is "Season est de Tempore, tamen virtus Traditionis sustinet" (From Season to Season, the Tradition Continues).

The 2010 Spartans were led by The All-Met Player of the Year, Bobby Wahl (Pitching: 13–0, 1.53 ERA, 82.1 IP, 118 K. Batting: .448 AVG., 3 HRs).

Varsity football

The 1978 West Springfield Spartan varsity football team finished the season undefeated (10–0) and won the Northern District Championship, but lost to James Madison High School in the regional playoffs.

The 1980 West Springfield Spartan varsity football team went to the Virginia AAA State Championship Game, losing to the Hampton Crabbers. The game was played at W.T. Woodson High School in Fairfax, Virginia.

The 1993 West Springfield Spartan varsity football team won the Northern District Championship with an undefeated run through the district schedule.  The Spartans defeated crosstown rival Lake Braddock Secondary School twice during the season and were the only team to score a touchdown on the Bruins the entire year. The Spartans would fall to the eventual state champs from Annandale High School in the Northern Region Championship game.

The 2007 West Springfield varsity football team (10–3) won the Patriot District Championship for the first time since 1994, but went on to lose in the Northern Region Final against the eventual State Champion Westfield Bulldogs.

The 2008 West Springfield Spartan varsity football team (10–3) won the Patriot District championship for the second year in a row. They lost in the second round of the playoffs to undefeated Oakton High School.

The 2014 West Springfield Spartan varsity football team (9–3) won the Patriot District Championship. They lost in the second round of the playoffs to Lake Braddock Secondary School after the Bruins scored with 2 seconds left in the game.

Dance team
The West Springfield dance team, otherwise known as WSDT, are seven-time consecutive NDA National Champions. 2010 in Medium Varsity Hip-Hop, and 2011-2016 in Large Varsity hip hop. In the 2011 America's Got Talent YouTube auditions, WSDT qualified as one of the top 12 acts, earning them a spot to compete on the show with the other 11 acts. After the in-show YouTube round, WSDT was eliminated in the judge's choice over choosing favors of 14-year-old dancer Beth Ann Robinson. However, Sharon Osbourne selected WSDT as her wildcard choice, giving them a second chance to qualify. In the wild card performance, neither Howie nor Piers responded favorably to WSDT's routine. During the results show they passed through to the semifinals. In the semifinals, they again compete against 11 acts for a place in the Final 10. In the results show, they were in the judge's choice again. With the decisions that the judges made, both Howie Mandel and Piers Morgan chose WSDT and they advanced to the Final 10. As they performed in the finals, the judges did not respond favorably to their performance as Piers Morgan gave them an X. In the results show, they were eliminated.

Cheerleading

The Spartan Cheerleading squad won the fall AAA state title in 2003. There was also winter champion as the sport was moved from winter to fall that year.

Cross-country/track and field

The West Springfield Boys Cross Country Teams won the AAA State Championship in 1989, 1993, 1994 and 1995, and the Class 6 championship in 2019. The West Springfield Boys Track team won the AAA State Championships  for both Indoor and Outdoor in 1996, and for Indoor in 1998. In 1997 a team with Sharif Karie took home The Penn Relays Championship of America in the 4x800m Relay.  At the time Karie's split of 1:50 was a carnival record.  Karie won the 1997 National Championship in the mile against future US Olympians John Riley and Gabe Jennings.  With the win Karie won Gatorade National Track and Field Athlete of the Year.  The following year West Springfield set a national record in 1998 in the distance medley relay with a time of 10:10.30, breaking a record that stood for over 15 years.

Swim and dive

The West Springfield Women's Swim and Dive teams won AAA State Championships in 1994, 1995, and 1996.

Crew
The WSHS crew team was established in 1981. The team primarily owns sweep style eights and fours. Previously the team owned a quad, as well as some smaller boats, but they have since been sold and WSHS crew no longer sculls.

In 2008, the men's freshman 8 was awarded the bronze medal at VASRA States, and continued through to compete in Nationals. At nationals, they were the fastest freshman men's 8 out of all of the public school competitors. The same year, the women's varsity eight also qualified for Nationals.

In 2009, the women's freshman 8 got 7th in the state, but with a disqualification of a higher ranking boat, was awarded a place to compete in Nationals.

In 2010, the men's junior eight won the silver medal at VASRA States and qualified to compete in Nationals. Both the women's lightweight four and women's varsity four won second place at states and qualified for Nationals. The women's second four won third place at states.

In 2011, the women's lightweight four won third place at states, qualifying them to compete in nationals. The Men's Varsity eight came in 9th place at State and competed in nationals

Music

The Wind Symphony has received consistent ratings of "Superior" at band festivals in previous years, and the Symphonic and Concert bands, while playing lower grade pieces, continued to receive "Superior" ratings. In 2016, both the Wind Symphony and the Symphonic Band received "Superior" ratings with the Wind Symphony competing in Grade 6, the highest grade possible in Virginia. The Jazz band has received "Superior" ratings in all of their recent competitions, and received several awards during their last spring trip. The Wind Symphony has also participated in concert band festivals such as the Virginia Music Educators Association Conference (VMEA) and the Music for All National Concert Band Festival in Indianapolis. The school's marching band, the Marching Spartans, has won multiple USSBA Group 5 (A and Open classes) championships, and are Virginia champions and All-States champions from 2015. The band has earned the title of Honor Band in 2000, 2006-2009, 2012-2020, 2022.

The Symphonic Orchestra played as an honor orchestra in the 2005 Virginia Music Educator's Association. There is also a Concert Orchestra, an orchestra below the level of the Symphonic Orchestra. A third orchestra is the Chamber Orchestra, a level above the Symphonic Orchestra, which was established in the 2008 school year for the elite players.

WSHS has a Guitar program, with school-provided guitars for students to use.  Their Jazz Guitar Combo is one of few high school groups of its kind in the region. They receive consistent ratings of "Superior," as does the Advanced Guitar Ensemble and Guitar Ensemble. The Guitar Program is currently the largest music department in terms of population, with their 5 different levels of difficulty.  Many freshman begin with Guitar 1 to learn the basics of the guitar, with many going on to Guitar 2, and many still go on to other ensembles. Members of the guitar program frequently show off their talents in West Springfield's Battle of the Bands, which every year proves to be phenomenal.

The choral program at WSHS features five classes, four of which require auditions. Concert Choir is an unauditioned mixed choir. The four audition choirs are Bel Canto, Madrigals, Personality, and Musical Theatre. Bel Canto is an all-women's choir that sometimes sings a cappella. Madrigals is a mixed a cappella choir, and the most musically proficient choir. Personality, a mixed show choir, briefly became an all-female show choir from 2010–2013 due to lack of male interest, but has become a mixed show choir once again for the 2013–2014 school year. Musical Theatre, offered for the first time in the 2009–2010 school year, is a mixed ensemble which performs songs from musicals, usually medleys, in addition to performing and critiquing solo songs during class. The all-women's show choir, Pizazz, was disbanded at the end of 2007, despite its numerous awards, due to lack of interest.

At competitions, the Choral Department has received many awards and recognitions, as well as many "Superior" ratings over the past several years. Personality's dances are often choreographed by student directors with dance experience and are revised by the choir director. Huss founded the musical theatre class because of her experience in the area and choreographs all dances.

Theatre

The West Springfield Theatre Department has taken part in the Cappies Critics program since it began in 2002.  The department is known for its high quality shows that have garnered many positive reviews. In 2013, West Springfield's production of "The Diary of Anne Frank" received a Cappie for Best Lead Actress in a Play (Catherine Ariale); and in the same year, won the VHSL state one-act competition for its show "The Other Room." In 2011, West Springfield's production of "Seussical" received a nomination for Best Male Vocalist (Rick Leith). In 2010, "The Lion, The Witch, and the Wardrobe" won a Cappie for Best Make-up.  Kelsey Rose was also nominated for Creativity for composing music and Megan Fraedrich was nominated for Best Supporting Actress in a play.  In 2009, West Springfield was nominated for Best Costumes, Best Stage Crew, and Best Lead Actress in a Musical (Erin Cafferky) for "Annie Get Your Gun".  In 2008, Sara Meinhofer won a Cappie for Best Choreography for "The Music Man." In addition, the school was nominated for Best Sound, Best Sets, Best Stage Crew, Best Orchestra, Best Ensemble in a Musical, and Best Lead Actress in a Musical (Sara Meinhofer). In 2021, West Springfield would submit their production of the play "Almost, Maine" as their Cappies production. It would go on to receive nominations for Best Actress in a Supporting Role (Adella Bailey) and Special Effects or Technology (TJ Green). In 2022, West Springfield went on to compete in the VHSL Theatre competition with "A Ballad of Dice & Disaster" by Finley Cochran and Mimi Deliee, and it would go on to place 3rd at the District Level, 1st at the Regional Level, and 3rd at the State Level for Class 6 Competition.  In 2023, West Springfield would compete in VHSL with "It Makes You Think" by Alayna Steele. They would place 3rd and 2nd in the District and Regional Levels, respectively.

Notable alumni
Patrick Forrester (class of 1975), astronaut
Laura (Cook) Lenderman (class of 1989), US Air Force General 
James Dexter (Class of 1991), professional football player
J (South Korean singer) (Class of 1996), Korean-American singer based in South Korea
Ryan Speier (Class of 1996), professional baseball player
Sharif Karie (Class of 1997), middle-distance running track runner
Kara Lawson  (Class of 1999), professional basketball player, Gold Medalist 2008 Olympics, ESPN personality
Joe Saunders (Class of 1999), professional baseball player 
Greg Calloway (Class of 2000), reality show winner
Brian Carroll (Class of 2000), professional soccer player
Jeremy Kapinos (Class of 2002), professional football player 2007–2012
Mike Caussin (Class of 2005), professional football player
Bryn Renner (Class of 2009), professional football player
Bobby Wahl (Class of 2010), baseball player
Lars Eckenrode (Class of 2013), professional soccer player
Virginia Thrasher (Class of 2015), professional sports shooter, Gold Medalist 2016 Olympics
Nikita Dragun (Class of 2014), YouTuber
Mohammed Seisay (Class of 2008), professional football player
Antonio Bustamante (Class of 2015), professional soccer player

References

Educational institutions established in 1966
Public high schools in Virginia
High schools in Fairfax County, Virginia
Northern Virginia Scholastic Hockey League teams
1966 establishments in Virginia
Springfield, Virginia
America's Got Talent contestants